Berkay Hardal (born 18 November 1996) is a Turkish actor. He first received media attention in 2017 when he appeared in İstanbullu Gelin.

Hardal is originally from Manisa Akhisar. He graduated from Trakya University. He had his first acting experience with the series İstanbullu Gelin, which was shared by Özcan Deniz and Aslı Enver. Hardal is known as Murat Boran in the series İstanbullu Gelin. In 2019 Hardal married his colleague and friend Dilan Telkök.

Filmography 
Television

References 

 https://www.sozcu.com.tr/hayatim/magazin-haberleri/berkay-hardal- 
 https://www.hurriyet.com.tr/galeri-jet-nikah-berkay-hardal-ile-dilay-telkok-evlendi-41349380

External links 
 

1996 births
Living people
Turkish male television actors
21st-century Turkish male actors